Oleksandr Lashyn (born March 2, 1982) is a professional strongman competitor from Ukraine. Olkesandr competes regularly in the WSF World Cup as well as the WSF World Team Cup, and has also competed in Strongman Champions League. Lashyn also won Ukraine's Strongest Man in 2011, and placed third at the 2008 World Log Lift Championships.

References

1982 births
Living people
Ukrainian strength athletes
Place of birth missing (living people)